The Faculty of Information (or the iSchool at the University of Toronto) is an undergraduate and graduate school that offers the following programs: a Bachelor of Information (BI), a Master of Information (MI), a Master of Museum Studies (MMSt), and a PhD in information studies, as well as diploma courses. As a member of the iSchool movement, the Faculty of Information takes an interdisciplinary approach to information studies, building on its traditional strengths in library and information science, complemented by research and teaching in archives, museum studies, user experience, information systems and design, critical information studies, culture and technology, knowledge management, digital humanities, the history of books, data science and other related fields. It is located on St. George Campus, in the Claude Bissell building, at 140 St. George Street, which is attached to the John P. Robarts Research Library and the Thomas Fisher Rare Book Library.

History 
The Faculty of Information was founded as the University of Toronto Library School within the Ontario College of Education in 1928 and was housed at 315 Bloor Street. In 1965, the School was designated as an independent unit within the university and became known as the School of Library Science and thus moved it quarters to 167 College Street and 256 McCaul Street. In 1971, SLS moved again to its present location at 140 St. George Street. In 1972, the name changed to the Faculty of Library Science (FLS), as the school attained faculty status. The name changed again to the Faculty of Library and Information Science (FLIS) in 1982 and then the Faculty of Information Studies (FIS) in 1994. In 2004, FIS joined the iSchool Caucus and accordingly in 2008, it was renamed the Faculty of Information (FI), also identifying itself as "the iSchool at Toronto".

The faculty has offered a variety of degrees since its inception, which at the same time reflect the changing requirements of entry into librarianship and more recently, into other information professions. Between 1928 and 1936, it offered one-year university Diploma in Librarianship, and from 1936 to 1970, a one-year Bachelor of Library Science degree, which was accredited by the American Library Association in 1937. The late 1960s saw the emergence of the Master of Library Science (MLS) degree as the first professional degree in librarianship, which was introduced in the School in 1970 and required four semesters to complete. Doctoral program, leading to a Doctor of Philosophy was established in 1971, with Claire England holding the first Ph.D. in library science that was awarded in Canada in 1974. In 1988, the faculty began to offer a Master of Information Science (MIS) degree. In 1995, the MLS and MIS degrees were both replaced with the Master of Information Studies (MISt) degree, which had three areas of specialization: archival studies, information systems, and library and information science. The name of the degree was changed to Master of Information (MI) in 2009. In 2019, the school welcomed its first cohort of its Bachelor of Information program.

Since 2006, when the Department of Museum Studies became part of FIS, the faculty began to offer a Master of Museum Studies degree.

Programs 

The Faculty of Information currently offers one bachelor's degree: Bachelor of Information (BI) and two master's degrees: Master of Information (MI) and Master of Museum Studies (MMSt), which are also offered together as a combined degree program (CDP). In addition, students can also enroll in a Ph.D. program and Graduate Diploma of Advanced Study in Information Studies (DAIS).

Bachelor of Information (BI)
Master of Information (MI)
Archives and Records Management (ARM)
Critical Information Policy Studies (CIPS)
Culture & Technology (C&T)
Human-Centred Data Science (HCDS)
Information Systems & Design (ISD)
Knowledge Management & Information Management (KMIM)
Library & Information Science (LIS)
User Experience Design (UXD)
Master of Museum Studies (MMSt)

Combined Degree Program (CDP) 
This program permits graduate students to complete a Masters of Information (MI) and a Masters of Museum Studies (MMSt) concurrently within the span of three years. This option was changed from Concurrent Registration Option (CRO) to Combined Degree Program (CDP) beginning in September 2018.

PhD Program 
The Faculty of Information also offers a PhD program in information studies, with seven available specializations: Critical Information Studies, Library & Information Science, Archives & Records Management, Information Systems, Media & Design, Cultural Heritage, Knowledge Management & Information Management, and Philosophy of Information.

Collaborative Programs 
Collaborative programs are open to all students enrolled in the MI and Ph.D. programs. They are designed to allow students to focus on specialized subject interests and since they are a result of cooperation between different graduate units at the university, separate admission process is required of those who wish enter them. Currently, there are eight collaborative programs available: Book History and Print Culture, based at Massey College, Knowledge Media Design, Addiction Studies, Aging, Palliative and Supportive Care Across the Life Course, Centre for Environment, Knowledge Media Design,  Sexual Diversity Studies, Women's Health, and Women and Gender Studies.

MMSt students are allowed to enroll in Book History and Print Culture, Jewish Studies, and Sexual Diversity Studies programs.

Graduate Diploma 
The iSchool offers a Graduate Diploma in Advanced Study in Information Studies (DAIS), which is for information professionals who want to add to their knowledge without taking a full PhD program. The diploma is only open to those who have a related master's degree.

Undergraduate Program 
The Bachelor of Information, first offered in 2019, is one of the first of its kind offering undergraduate students an interdisciplinary space to collaborate on work, engage with concepts from a variety of fields, explore professional experiences, and engage in design work.

Facilities 
The iSchool occupies all seven floors of the Claude Bissell building, which is attached to the John P. Robarts Research Library and the Thomas Fisher Rare Book Library. The building houses classrooms, administration, faculty offices, as well as the Inforum.

Inforum 
The Inforum was the former library and "academic and community hub" at the FI. It contained a specialized collection devoted to the studies at the FI, including library and information science, archival studies, knowledge management, information systems and design, museum studies, and other related areas. It also included a special collection on subject analysis system. The library collection was removed in August 2019, despite advocacy efforts by the community to save the collection. In 2020, the Inforum became a Student Services space. Since 2021, it has been styled as "the learning hub".

Semaphore Lab 
Semaphore Lab is a research cluster dedicated to inclusive design in the area of mobile and pervasive computing. Launched in 2012, it shares space with the Critical Making Lab in Robarts Library.

ThingTank Lab 
The ThingTank lab originated in 2009 as the Designing Digital Media for the Internet of Things (DDiMIT). In 2010, the lab was funded and renamed to ThingTank. The lab is located off-campus, on Bathurst Street in Toronto. The lab offers workshops, idea jams and roundtable events aimed at supporting activity in exploration and development of internet enabled “things.” The lab use is not restricted to University of Toronto faculty and students, but open to other universities, and those in the public and private sectors.

Institutes

Knowledge Media Design Institute
The Knowledge Media Design Institute (KMDI) was founded in 1996 as the University of Toronto's first virtual institute. KMDI offers one of the collaborative programs available to graduate students at the University of Toronto. The current Director of KMDI is professor Sara Grimes.

The McLuhan Centre for Culture and Technology 
Located in the historic McLuhan Coach House, the Centre was first launched in 1963 as the Centre for Culture and Technology. The Centre joined the Faculty of Information as a distinct research and teaching unit in 1994, and was renamed as The McLuhan Centre for Culture and Technology in June 2016. The McLuhan Centre is the home of the McLuhan Program in Culture and Technology, which aims to encourage understanding of the impact of technology on our culture and society. The Interim Director of The McLuhan Centre for Culture and Technology is Seamus Ross and the Director of the McLuhan Program in Culture and Technology is Sarah Sharma.

Digital Curation Institute 
The Digital Curation Institute (DCI) is headed by Christoph Becker, an iSchool faculty member.

Deans
2016–Present Wendy Duff
2009–2015 Seamus Ross
2003–2008 Brian Cantwell Smith
1995–2003 Lynne Howarth
1990–1995 Adele M. Fasick
1984–1990 Ann H. Schabas
1979–1984 Katherine H. Packer
1972–1978 Francess Georgina Halpenny
1972            R. Brian Land
Professor Marsha Chechik from the Department of Computer Science at the Faculty of Arts and Science has been appointed Acting Dean for a six-month period from July 1, 2022 to December 31, 2022 while Dean Wendy Duff is on administrative leave.

Directors
1964—1972 R. Brian Land
1951—1964 Bertha Bassam
1928—1951 Winifred G. Barnstead

Journals

Faculty of Information Quarterly 

The Faculty of Information Quarterly (F/IQ), is a scholarly, peer-reviewed, open-access e-journal founded and operated entirely by students at the FI. The mission of F/IQ is to create an intellectual space for the information community to analyse and critically assess the divergent topics that comprise the field's study and practice, and to define and direct the iSchool movement through scholarly and professional communications as a means to fostering collective identity among students, faculty and practitioners of the field. F/IQ was first published in October, 2008.

The journal accepts submissions from both established and emerging scholars and practitioners in information-related fields, such as archival science, information systems, library science, museum studies and others.

Published four times a year, F/IQ includes original research, guest editorials, interviews with senior scholars and professionals in the field, and book reviews. It uses Open Journal Systems (OJS) for publishing.

The iJournal
The iJournal is the University of Toronto (U of T) Faculty of Information's (iSchool) open access academic journal. Founded in 2016, it is written, edited, directed, designed and produced by (mostly graduate) students at the Faculty of Information. The topics of the iJournal reflects the multiple disciplines that make up the information sciences taught at the Faculty. As of March 2022, the iJournal has published seventeen issues, including one special edition (summer 2017) and three (2016, 2018, 2019) iSchool Student Conference proceedings.

Alumni Association 
The Faculty of Information Alumni Association (FIAA) was first founded in 1929 and represents over 6,700 graduates of the FI. It sponsors a number of events and programs, including Job Shadowing and publishes an online magazine, Informed, dedicated to news about the FI, faculty and alumni.

Notes

External links 
Faculty of Information

Information Studies, U of T, Faculty of
Information schools
American Library Association accredited library schools